The First Book of Nephi: His Reign and Ministry, usually referred to as First Nephi or 1 Nephi, is the first book of the Book of Mormon and one of four books with the name Nephi. The original translation of the title did not include the word "first". First and Second were added to the titles of the Books of Nephi by Oliver Cowdery when preparing the book for printing. It is, according to the book itself, a first-person narrative by a prophet named Nephi, of events that began around 600 BC and recorded on the small plates of Nephi approximately 30 years later. Its 22 chapters tell the story of one family's challenges and the miracles they witness as they escape from Jerusalem, struggle to survive in the wilderness, build a ship and sail to the Americas. The book is composed of two intermingled genres; one a historical narrative describing the events and conversations that occurred and the other a recording of visions, sermons, poetry, and doctrinal discourses as shared by either Nephi or Lehi to members of the family. Originally seven chapters in length, the book was reformatted in 1879 by Orson Pratt to its current state, twenty-two chapters in length.

The Second Book of Nephi is a continuation of this narrative and immediately follows this book.

Narrative

Fleeing Jerusalem
Beginning in Jerusalem at the time of King Zedekiah, Nephi's father Lehi, has a vision and is warned of the imminent Babylonian destruction of Jerusalem. Lehi attempts to share this warning with the people of Jerusalem, but they reject him and try to kill him. Lehi and his family (wife Sariah, four sons Laman, Lemuel, Sam, and Nephi, and unnamed daughters) leave Jerusalem and establish a camp in the wilderness. Lehi preaches to his family, especially Laman and Lemuel who do not believe their father's vision and complained about the wealth and comforts they left behind. After praying, Nephi is convinced of his father's words and inspires his older brother Sam to also believe. As Nephi prays, the Lord promises that he will be a "ruler and a teacher" over his brothers, so long as he is faithful and they continue to rebel.

Lehi sends his sons back to Jerusalem to retrieve the brass plates, a record similar to the Old Testament, which was kept by Laban, a powerful leader in Jerusalem. Nephi and his brothers return and become frustrated after two failed attempts, where Laban tries to steal Lehi's property and murder his sons. After an angel appears, Nephi returns alone, finding Laban drunk and unconscious. Nephi kills Laban with his own sword, then tricks Laban's treasurer, Zoram, to bring the brass plates outside the city to his brothers. Zoram discovers Nephi's trick and tries to flee, but Nephi persuades him to travel with his family, and they all return together with the plates.

Lehi carefully studies the brass plates, and discovers the genealogy of his family. The brass plates indicate that he is a descendant of Joseph, the son of Jacob. The plates also contain the five books of Moses, the writings of Isaiah and Jeremiah, and other prophets.

Lehi's sons return to Jerusalem once more to retrieve the family of Ishmael, some of whom later become spouses for Lehi's children.

Visions of Lehi and Nephi
Lehi has a vision of the tree of life. Relating this vision to his children, he expounds on it by teaching about the Messiah, and that they need to be righteous. Nephi prays to the Lord for a similar vision and help understanding his father's vision. In his vision, Nephi sees the vision his father had described, and also given an explanation about its symbolism. Nephi is shown many past and future events, including the life of the Son of God. He also sees the civilizations of his descendants, the voyages of Columbus, the American Revolutionary War, the scattering of his descendants (the American Indians), the Book of Mormon, its translation by Joseph Smith, the restoration of God's church, continued revelation in the modern era, and the correction of biblical translation errors. Nephi sees apocalyptic events, but is forbidden to write about them because John the Apostle will write them in the Bible. Finally, Nephi sees the future generations of his descendants, and of his brothers Laman and Lemuel. Whereas his people will have the gospel, they will ultimately be destroyed for wickedness; however the children of his brothers will be raised without a knowledge of the gospel, survive to the modern era, and be taught by the gospel and the restored church.

After Nephi's vision, Laman and Lemuel argue over the meaning of Lehi's vision. Nephi chastises them for not asking the Lord for the interpretation, and explains the point they were disputing. He pleads with them to pray and repent.

Traveling the desert
After Lehi's sons marry Ishmael's daughters, Lehi discovers a "ball of curious workmanship" (a compass) at his tent door. Using the directions on the ball, they journey southeast along the Red Sea. As they travel, Nephi's steel bow breaks while hunting. Upon hearing the news, the entire camp complains and blasphemes for their misfortune, including Lehi. Nephi makes a new wooden bow and asks Lehi where to hunt. Humbled, Lehi repents and asks the Lord. Nephi is able to find food for the camp. They discover a message on the ball that it only works when they are faithful. When they are righteous, it will lead them through fertile land. If they are wicked, it will not function properly.

Ishmael dies on their journey near Nahom. In mourning, Ishmael's daughters complain about the difficult journey and desire to return to Jerusalem. Laman and Lemuel conspire to kill Lehi and Nephi, but the voice of the Lord chastises them, and they repent. They continue traveling Eastward through the desert for eight more years, and their wives bear children.

Building the ship
Arriving in a place near the sea, they set up a camp and call the area Bountiful. After many days, the voice of the Lord commands Nephi to go up the mountain. Once on the mountain, the Lord instructs Nephi to build a ship, and describes how to build a ship and how to make the tools needed. Nephi returns to camp and begins work. Laman and Lemuel mock him for trying an impossible task. Nephi lectures them, which greatly angers them. Nephi warns Laman and Lemuel not to touch him or they would die instantly, as he was filled with the spirit of God, then commands them to help build the ship. The Lord commands Nephi to touch them, saying it will not kill them but greatly shock them. Laman and Lemuel proclaim they now know Nephi is doing God's will, and repent.

They complete the ship, and the Lord commands Lehi to load everyone and all their supplies on the ship. They depart on the ocean. Many days later, Laman and Lemuel and the sons of Ishmael begin partying, dancing, and sinning. Nephi, fearing that the Lord would be angry with them, speaks to them. Angered, Laman and Lemuel bind Nephi. The compass stops working, and the ship is caught in a terrible storm. At the pleading of their wives, and for fear of sinking, Laman and Lemuel release Nephi. Nephi prays, and the storm stops. Many days later, they arrive in the promised land, on the American continent.

In the promised land
Upon arriving in America, they begin building farms, planting crops, raise native livestock, and mine ore. The Lord commands Nephi to make metal plates to chronicle the events of his people, their genealogy, and write the gospel the Lord gives him.

The final parts of First Nephi contain some teachings of Jesus Christ. He quotes Isaiah (Chapters 48 through 54). He says all the ancient prophets testified of the Savior, and only through him can they be redeemed for their sins.

Prophecies

Internal prophecies 
Nephi makes a number of prophecies that are fulfilled within the Book of Mormon. Nephi sees the land of America, and that his descendants fill the land with innumerable cities. He also sees many of the wars that would take place between his descendants and the descendants of Laman and Lemuel.

External prophecies

There are several prophecies that are made that can only be fulfilled outside of the Book of Mormon. Key among these are the prophecies concerning the birth, life, and death of the Savior. Nephi records that Jesus would be born to a virgin, "the mother of the Son of God, after the manner of the flesh" (1 Nephi 11:18); that Jesus would be baptized; that there would be twelve disciples; that he would heal the sick and bedeviled; that he would be judged by the world; and that he would be crucified.

Although in the book of First Nephi Jesus is never identified by name, he is identified as the son of God, a great prophet, the messiah, and the savior of the world.

In First Nephi, Nephi's father Lehi prophesied that Jerusalem would be destroyed by the Babylonians.

Nephi also prophesies concerning the future of the American continent. He sees people flee from Europe to settle in America; that the Bible (a record from the Jews) would travel among the people; that the people settling in America would drive the indigenous people out of the land; that the settlers would overpower Europe; the discovery and translation of the Book of Mormon; and that the apostle John the Revelator would write concerning the final days.

Interpretations of Nephi's vision

Perhaps the most potentially controversial part of the First Book of Nephi is the misunderstanding that has resulted from descriptions trying to define the "great and abominable church" that Nephi sees among the "nations and kingdoms of the Gentiles"(I Nephi 13:3-8). It may be of interest to note how this particular vision has affected Mormonism's view toward the rest of Christianity.

The Great and Abominable Church

Nephi sees the persecution of the apostles and their followers by the "house of Israel", then later sees a "great church" that is, according to the description of the angel, "...most abominable above all other churches, which slayeth the saints of God, yea, and tortureth them and bindeth them down, and yoketh them with a yoke of iron...". The description almost immediately appears to be describing the persecution of Reformers and Protestant or proto-Protestant groups of people who suffered persecution and execution before, during, and after the Middle Ages, and this view seems to have been held by Bruce R. McConkie in his first edition of Mormon Doctrine. While Mormons do not believe such groups had the fullness of the gospel (often meaning priesthood authority of the Aaronic and Melchizedek Priesthoods), and neither considering themselves Protestant, they do however believe that such groups had many righteous leaders and members who could be considered saints because they followed the light of Christ and sought to follow Him. Such people would include Wycliffe and Tyndale, who have been brought up most recently in an LDS General Conference.
The majority of members of The Church of Jesus Christ of Latter-day Saints believe that this great and abominable church includes any organized group of people who fight against God and His divine purposes by means of persecution, false teachings and belief systems, and oppression. Bruce R. McConkie, who was later ordained an apostle of the LDS Church, originally wrote his opinion that the Catholic Church was the great and abominable church, but very few in the LDS Church share his view today. His meaning of the Catholic Church was the church in its original state when it was executing and plundering and hiding its crimes as a government and a church. Scriptures indicate organizations and nations during periods of times, but not necessarily throughout the span of history in its entirety.

The idea that the great and abominable church includes all evil institutions may appear completely accurate to some, since there were also immoral institutions even before the death of the Apostles. However, when Christ was crucified and his apostles and the saints were killed, the proper leadership of his church was lost. There was no longer authority directed from Christ on the earth and therefore man began to lead the church based on their own beliefs. This eventually led to changes away from true doctrine and the formation of many churches holding different viewpoints. Other churches had existed during the time of the apostles, but from the church Christ set up, after the corruption and mystification of doctrine in the Bible, the Catholic Church began to rise. Precisely what "The Great and Abominable Church" is, however, remains vague.

The Taking Away of Truth from the Bible

Besides the persecution of the saints, Nephi sees that people who comprise the great and abominable church among the Gentiles would also be involved with taking "away from the gospel of the Lamb many parts which are plain and most precious; and also many covenants of the Lord have they taken away."
They would do this by taking the record of the Jews that would go forth "in purity" "by the hand of the twelve apostles of the Lamb" to the Gentiles, and taking away "plain and precious things" from the "book of the Lamb of God." Latter-day Saints believe that the Bible lost some of its originally intended meaning and doctrine as spoken by the ancient prophets and apostles because of this taking away of plain and precious truths by some Gentile teachers and compilers soon after the death of the apostles, though the Bible remained an important source of truth as attested by Nephi. This could be looked upon when the council of Nicaea voted on which parts of the Bible were "true doctrine."

Future Events and Books of Scripture  

Nephi sees in his vision that the record and testimony of his people in the Book of Mormon is brought forth "unto the Gentiles, by the gift and power of the Lamb." He sees this book taken to the descendants of the Lamanites to teach them the fullness of the gospel, and that other books are also brought by the Gentiles to them and to all the house of Israel to convince them "that the records of the twelve apostles of the Lamb are true."  He sees that these books have the important role of making known the "plain and precious things" that had been lost from the Bible, but also "establish the truth of the first" (the Bible).

Nephi teaches of the fulfillment of the Abrahamic covenant when scattered Israel will be gathered through believing in Jesus Christ and his divine mission and atonement. He sees that there will be "wars and rumors of wars among all the nations and kindreds of the earth," but that "the covenant people of the Lord, ...scattered upon all the face of the earth," ... "were armed with righteousness and with the power of God in great glory." He foresees the eventual destruction of the great and abominable church, and the triumph of Christ's reign on earth during the Millennium.

See also

 The Book of Mormon Movie, Vol. 1: The Journey

Notes

Further reading

.

External links

The First Book of Nephi from the official website of The Church of Jesus Christ of Latter-Day Saints

Nephi1